Selden is an unincorporated community in Gloucester County, in the U. S. state of Virginia.

Site 44GL103-Quest End was added to the National Register of Historic Places in 2008.

References

Unincorporated communities in Virginia
Unincorporated communities in Gloucester County, Virginia